Typhlolabia is a genus of diplurans in the family Japygidae.

Species
 Typhlolabia afer (Silvestri, 1948)
 Typhlolabia bidentata (Schäffer, 1897)
 Typhlolabia costala (González & Smith, 1964)
 Typhlolabia hirsuta (González & Smith, 1964)
 Typhlolabia larva (Philippi, 1863)
 Typhlolabia megalocera (Silvestri, 1902)
 Typhlolabia parca (Silvestri, 1948)
 Typhlolabia profunda (Smith, 1962)
 Typhlolabia riestrae (Silvestri, 1948)
 Typhlolabia talcae (Smith, 1962)
 Typhlolabia vivaldii (Silvestri, 1929)

References

Diplura